Hunter Greene may refer to:

Hunter Greene (baseball), American baseball player
Hunter Greene (basketball), American basketball player
Hunter Greene (politician), American politician from Louisiana

See also
Hunter green, a shade of green